Te Puke High School is a state, co-educational secondary school located in Te Puke, New Zealand. The school serves students from Year 9 to Year 13, and had a roll of 915 students as of February 2017.

Students 
The two largest ethnic groups at the school are New Zealand European, which comprises 45% of students, and Māori, which comprises 37%. The rest of the school comprises 5% Indian, 4% Other European, 3% Kiribati, 2% Other Pacific, 2% South East Asian, 1% Other Asian and 1% Other. 51% of students are female, and 49% are male.

Curriculum
Te Puke High School redesigned the Junior School Curriculum (Years 9 and 10) around 2015–2016, for "21st Century Learning" moving away from the traditional isolated subject classes (e.g. Mathematics or English) and enhanced the Integrated Learning approach. They created "Themes" consisting of five core subjects, English, History/Social Science, Mathematics, Physical Education/Health and Science, in which all five subjects are taught in a cross-curricular approach. They created SPINS (SPecial INterest Subjects) which have been traditionally called "Options" (e.g. Materials, Drama, Visual Arts). The final aspect was Foci. Foci's are where students can enhance a deeper understanding/knowledge into a particular interest of two subjects (e.g. A "Board Gaming" foci can focus on the Mathematical and Social Science sides of "gaming", and interest "gaming" students. Te Puke High School is looking to integrate some of these concepts into the Senior Curriculum over the next few years.

Facilities 
In 2013, some redevelopment took place at the school. A main school block was created in a 'V' shape, with several learning pods on each side, the special needs unit at the tip, and a large courtyard in the centre. Each "pod" can have up to three classes operating within it at a time, and science labs are located between the pods. The school wharenui was also rebuilt. In early 2017, the Performing Arts/Administration Block went under much needed renovations.

Houses
Te Puke High School consists of five houses/factions:
 Blake - Red
Named after Sir Peter Blake
 Hillary - Yellow
Named after Sir Edmund Hillary
 Morihana - Purple
Named after Sir Howard Morrison 
 Ngata - Green
Named after Sir Āpirana Ngata
 Sheppard - Blue
Named after Kate Sheppard

Notable ex-pupils 
 Ruia Morrison, tennis player

References

External links
School Website

Secondary schools in the Bay of Plenty Region
Western Bay of Plenty District